Niqmi-Epuh, also given as Niqmepa (reigned  - Middle chronology ) was the king of Yamhad (Halab) succeeding his father Yarim-Lim II

Reign

Little of Aleppo has been excavated by archaeologists, knowledge about Niqmi-Epuh comes from tablets discovered at Alalakh. His existence is confirmed by a number of tablets with his seal on their envelope

Yarim-Lim king of Alalakh, uncle of Yarim-Lim II and vassal of Yamhad died during Niqmi-Epuh's reign and was succeeded by his son Ammitakum, who started to assert Alalakh's semi-independence.

The tablets mention Niqmi-Epuh's votive status which he dedicated to Hadad and placed it in that deity's Temple. Tablet AlT*11 informs of his return from Nishin, a place not known before, but certainly inside the territory of Yamhad because the tablet seems to refer to travel and not a military campaign.

Niqmi-Epuh's most celebrated deed was his conquest of the town Arazik, near Charchemish, the fall of this city was important to the extent of being suitable for dating several legal cases.

Niqmi-Epuh Seal
The seal of Niqmi-Epuh includes his name written in cuneiform inscription. The king is depicted wearing a crown, facing two goddesses, one in Syrian dress, while and the other is wearing Babylonian dress.

Death and succession
Niqmi-Epuh died ca. 1675 BC. He seems to have a number of sons, including Irkabtum who succeeded him immediately, prince Abba-El, and possibly Yarim-Lim III. Hammurabi III the last king before the Hittites conquest might have been his son too.

References

Citations

17th-century BC rulers
Kings of Yamhad
People from Aleppo
Amorite kings
Yamhad dynasty
17th-century BC people